The Svalbard Treaty (originally the Spitsbergen Treaty) recognises the sovereignty of Norway over the Arctic archipelago of Svalbard, at the time called Spitsbergen. The exercise of sovereignty is, however, subject to certain stipulations, and not all Norwegian law applies. The treaty regulates the demilitarisation of the archipelago. The signatories were given equal rights to engage in commercial activities (mainly coal mining) on the islands. , Norway and Russia make use of this right.

Uniquely, the archipelago is an entirely visa-free zone under the terms of the Svalbard Treaty.

The treaty was signed on 9 February 1920 and submitted for registration in the League of Nations Treaty Series on 21 October 1920. There were 14 original High Contracting Parties: Denmark, France, Italy, Japan, the Netherlands, Norway, Sweden, the United Kingdom (including the dominions of Australia, Canada, New Zealand, South Africa, India), and the United States. Of the original signatories, Japan was the last to ratify the treaty on 2 April 1925, and the treaty came into force on 14 August 1925.

Many additional nations acceded to the treaty after it was ratified by the original signatories, including several before it came into force. , there are 46 parties to the treaty.

Name of the treaty
The original treaty is titled the Treaty recognising the sovereignty of Norway over the Archipelago of Spitsbergen. It refers to the entire archipelago as Spitsbergen, which had been the only name in common usage since 1596 (with minor variations in spelling). In 1925, five years after the conclusion of the treaty, the Norwegian authorities proceeded to officially rename the islands "Svalbard". This new name was a modern adaptation of the ancient toponym , attested in the Norse sagas as early as 1194. The exonym Spitsbergen subsequently came to be applied to the main island in the archipelago. Accordingly, in modern historiography the Treaty of Spitsbergen is commonly referred to anachronistically as the Svalbard Treaty to reflect the name change.

History
The archipelago was discovered by the Dutch explorer Willem Barentsz in 1596. It was named Spitsbergen, meaning 'sharp-peaked mountains' (literally 'spits-berg'). It was uninhabited. The islands were renamed in the 1920s by Norway as Svalbard.

Spitsbergen/Svalbard began as a territory free of a nation, with people from different countries participating in industries including fishing, whaling, mining, research and later, tourism. Not belonging to any nation left Svalbard largely free of regulations or laws, though there were conflicts over the area due to whaling rights and sovereignty disputes between England, the Netherlands and Denmark–Norway in the first half of the 17th century. By the 20th century mineral deposits were found on the main island and continual conflicts between miners and owners created the need for a government.

Contents
The Spitsbergen Treaty was signed in Paris on 9 February 1920, during the Versailles negotiations after World War I. In this treaty, international diplomacy recognized Norwegian sovereignty (the Norwegian administration went in effect by 1925) and other principles relating to Svalbard. This includes:

 Svalbard is part of Norway: Svalbard is completely controlled by and forms part of the Kingdom of Norway. However, Norway's power over Svalbard is restricted by the limitations listed below:
 Taxation: Taxes are allowed to be collected, but only enough to support Svalbard and the Svalbard government. This results in lower taxes than mainland Norway and the exclusion of any taxes on Svalbard supporting mainland Norway directly. Svalbard's revenues and expenses are separately budgeted from mainland Norway.
 Environmental conservation: Norway must respect and preserve the Svalbard environment.
 Non-discrimination: All citizens and all companies of every nation under the treaty are allowed to become residents and to have access to Svalbard including the right to fish, hunt or undertake any kind of maritime, industrial, mining or trade activity. The residents of Svalbard must follow Norwegian law, though Norwegian authority cannot discriminate against or favour any residents of any given nationality.
  Military restrictions: Article 9 prohibits naval bases and fortifications and also the use of Svalbard for war-like purposes. It is not, however, entirely demilitarised.

Disputes regarding natural resources

Two hundred nautical mile zone around Svalbard
There has been a long-running dispute, primarily between Norway and Russia (and before it, the Soviet Union) over fishing rights in the region. In 1977, Norway established a regulated fishery in a  zone around Svalbard (though it did not close the zone to foreign access). Norway argues that the treaty's provisions of equal economic access apply only to the islands and their territorial waters (four nautical miles at the time) but not to the wider exclusive economic zone. In addition, it argues that the continental shelf is a part of mainland Norway's continental shelf and should be governed by the 1958 Continental Shelf Convention. The Soviet Union/Russia disputed and continues to dispute this position and consider the Spitsbergen Treaty to apply to the entire zone. Talks were held in 1978 in Moscow but did not resolve the issue. Finland and Canada support Norway's position, while most of the other treaty signatories have expressed no official position. The relevant parts of the treaty are as follows:

Ships and nationals of all the High Contracting Parties shall enjoy equally the rights of fishing and hunting in the territories specified in Article 1 and in their territorial waters. (from Article 2)

They shall be admitted under the same conditions of equality to the exercise and practice of all maritime, industrial, mining or commercial enterprises both on land and in the territorial waters, and no monopoly shall be established on any account or for any enterprise whatever. (from Article 3)

Natural resources outside the 200 nautical mile zone
"Mainly the dispute is about whether the Svalbard Treaty also is in effect outside the 12 nautical mile territorial sea," according to Norway's largest newspaper, Aftenposten. If the treaty comes into effect outside the zone, then Norway will not be able to claim the full 78% of profits of oil- and gas harvesting, said Aftenposten in 2011.

Parties
A list of parties is shown below; the dates below reflect when a nation deposited its instrument of ratification or accession. Some parties are successor states to the countries that joined the treaty, as noted below.

See also 
 List of treaties
 Antarctic Treaty System

References

Further reading

External links 

 Treaty between Norway, The United States of America, Denmark, France, Italy, Japan, the Netherlands, Great Britain and Ireland and the British overseas Dominions and Sweden concerning Spitsbergen signed in Paris 9th February 1920.
 Treaty Concerning the Archipelago of Spitsbergen
 Svalbard Treaty and Ratification 
 Svalbard – an important arena – Speech by Norwegian Minister of Foreign Affairs, 15 April 2006.

History of Svalbard
1920 in Norway
Treaties of the Soviet Union
Treaties of Norway
Norway–Russia relations
Norway–Soviet Union relations
Treaties concluded in 1920
Treaties entered into force in 1925
Politics of Svalbard
Treaties of the Emirate of Afghanistan
Treaties of the Albanian Kingdom (1928–1939)
Treaties of Argentina
Treaties extended to Australia
Treaties of the First Austrian Republic
Treaties of Belgium
Treaties of the Kingdom of Bulgaria
Treaties extended to Canada
Treaties of Chile
Treaties of the Republic of China (1912–1949)
Treaties of the Czech Republic
Treaties of Denmark
Treaties of the Dominican Republic
Treaties of the Kingdom of Egypt
Treaties of Estonia
Treaties of Finland
Treaties of the French Third Republic
Treaties of the Weimar Republic
Treaties of the Second Hellenic Republic
Treaties of the Kingdom of Hungary (1920–1946)
Treaties of Iceland
Treaties extended to British India
Treaties of the Empire of Japan
Treaties of the Kingdom of Italy (1861–1946)
Treaties of North Korea
Treaties of Latvia
Treaties of Lithuania
Treaties of Monaco
Treaties of the Netherlands
Treaties extended to New Zealand
Treaties of the Second Polish Republic
Treaties of the Ditadura Nacional
Treaties of the Kingdom of Romania
Treaties of the Kingdom of Hejaz and Nejd
Treaties extended to the Union of South Africa
Treaties of Spain under the Restoration
Treaties of Sweden
Treaties of Switzerland
Treaties of the Ukrainian Soviet Socialist Republic
Treaties of the United Kingdom
Treaties of the United States
Treaties of Venezuela
Treaties extended to Curaçao and Dependencies
Treaties extended to the Faroe Islands
Treaties extended to Greenland
Concession territories
Government of the Arctic
February 1920 events